The 2015 Bayelsa State House of Assembly election was held on April 11, 2015, to elect members of the Bayelsa State House of Assembly in Nigeria. All the 24 seats were up for election in the Bayelsa State House of Assembly.

Kombowei Benson from PDP representing Southern Ijaw IV constituency was elected Speaker, while Abraham Ingobere from PDP representing Brass III constituency was elected Deputy Speaker.

Results 
The result of the election is listed below.

 Owoko Kate from PDP won Southern Ijaw I constituency
 Monday Bubou Obolo from PDP won Southern Ijaw II constituency
 Daniel Baraladei Igali from PDP won Southern Ijaw III constituency
 Kombowei Benson from PDP won Southern Ijaw IV constituency
 Sunny Israel-Goli from APC won Brass I constituency
 Belemote Watson from APGA won Brass II constituency
 Abraham Ingobere from PDP won Brass III constituency
 Peter Pereotubo Akpe from PDP won Sagbama I constituency
 Bernard Kenebai from PDP won Sagbama II constituency
 Salo Adikumo from PDP won Sagbama III constituency
 Tonye Emmanuel Isenah from PDP won Kolokuma/Opokuma I constituency
 Ebiye Tarabina from APGA won Kolokuma/Opokuma II constituency
 Ball Torufade Oyarede from PDP won Ekeremor I constituency
 Omonibeke Kemelayefa from PDP won Ekeremor II constituency
 Michael Ogbere from PDP won Ekeremor III constituency
 Mitema Obordor from PDP won Ogbia I constituency
 Michael Awoli Anapurere from PDP won Ogbia II constituency
 Naomi Ogoli from PDP won Ogbia III constituency
 Parkinson Markmanuel from PDP won Yenagoa I constituency
 Ebiuwou Koku Obiyai from PDP won Yenagoa II constituency
 Gentle Emelah from PDP won Yenagoa III constituency
 Ololo Ebi Ben from PDP won Nembe I constituency
 Ingo Iwowari from PDP won Nembe II constituency
 Obiene Iniyobio from PDP won Nembe III constituency

References 

Bayelsa
Bayelsa State House of Assembly elections
2015 Bayelsa State elections